The Juan de la Cruz Band was a Filipino rock group formed in 1968, that pioneered what became known as Pinoy rock. 

Founding guitarist Wally Gonzalez credited his fellow founding member, drummer Edmond Fortuno (a.k.a. "Bosyo"), with having introduced the band's name. In December 1970, the band was lauded for headlining the first open field rock festival in the Philippines. In 1971, they released their first album as a quintet, and thereafter gained momentum when it was performed in a rock opera with the Manila Symphony Orchestra, the first production of its kind in the country. Juan de la Cruz reinvented itself in 1973 as a power trio and rose to stardom as the premier rock band in the Philippines.

History

Up in Arms
The original Juan de la Cruz Band, consisting of Wally Gonzalez (guitar/vocals), Sandy Tagarro (bass guitar/vocals), Edmond Fortuno (drums), Bing Labrador (keyboards) and Alex Cruz (saxophones and flute), was formed in 1968. In December 1970, they performed in the Antipolo Rock Festival (the Philippine equivalent to the Woodstock festival of 1969). They were subsequently tapped in September 1971 as the featured rock band in tandem with the Manila Symphony Orchestra (conducted by Redentor Romero) for the Philippine production of the rock opera by Tim Rice and Andrew Lloyd Webber, Jesus Christ Superstar, at the Cultural Center of the Philippines. Consequent to his dramatic part as the Judas character in the rock opera production, Sandy Tagarro vacated his instrumentalist role in the group and was replaced by Clifford Ho as bassist.

Upon the conclusion of the Jesus Christ Superstar production, Edmund Fortuno (aka "Bosyo"), Bing Labrador and Alex Cruz (with guitarist Vic Naldo and bassist Marlon Ilagan) formed a splinter group, Anak Bayan which, together with the Manila Symphony Orchestra, performed for another major production run at the Cultural Center, the rock opera, Tommy by The Who.

The versatile Sandy Tagarro returned to the Juan de la Cruz Band, occupying the drummer's seat as Fortuno's replacement, and also as the band's lead vocalist; while Clifford Ho continued on bass. A musician from the Manila Symphony Orchestra (whom they had befriended in the Jesus Christ Superstar production), Romy Santos (flute/sax/clarinet), replaced Alex Cruz. Rene Sogueco (keyboards/vocal) was also recruited to replace Bing Labrador. In the wake of this major revamp, the Juan de la Cruz Band recorded its first album in 1971, entitled Up in Arms, which was released by Vicor Music Corporation under its Sunshine Records imprint. However, complications in the band caused Sandy Tagarro to leave abruptly barely after concluding the Up in Arms recording sessions; not even to pose for the album's photography. Consequently, the group picture for the LP's album cover showed a different drummer (Bobot Guerrero), with Tagarro's name stricken off the personnel credits, with exception of a parenthetical credit of him as composer of one song ("Lady in White Satin"). Bobot Guerrero's entry as the new drummer of Juan de la Cruz continued through the promotional run of the album and into concerts and club stints.

The Up in Arms album was not a commercial success and had not been reissued, by Vicor Music Corporation to date. An unauthorized compact disc translation of the LP (albeit excellently remastered and packaged) by Shadoks/Normal Music (Bonn, Germany) with spurious bonus tracks from a later edition of the band—is sold in online Internet shops. Wally Gonzales is showcased as a rock guitarist with progressive leanings in this early effort. In several months, keyboardist Rene Sugueco had also left (briefly replaced by Larry Martinez), and bassist Clifford Ho (briefly replaced by Tony Rodriguez). It was during this transition phase that Joey Smith had recently returned to the Philippines from a successful sojourn in Japan, and in 1973 had accepted a cameo singing role at the Cultural Center's "Little Theater" for an abortive rock musical (produced by Carlitos Benavides) based on Erich Segal's novel then in vogue, Love Story, in which the Juan de la Cruz Band was once again called upon to perform. This was also the period when the members of Juan de la Cruz Band and Anak Bayan were freely associating and performing collectively as a "supergroup" ensemble in various concerts.  Nides Aranza-Mendez, a notable rock drummer also jammed with the group and performed on the classic first live album, "Super Session".

Himig Natin
The state of Juan de la Cruz's flux and gradual dissolution led Wally Gonzalez to reconvene an all-new powerhouse trio, together with Joey Smith (later a.k.a. "Pepe Smith") as singer-drummer-composer; and with singer-bassist-composer Mike Hanopol. Smith and Hanopol collaborated in Tokyo with Japanese guitarist Shinki Chen in a heavy psychedelic blues "free-rock" trio setup called Speed, Glue & Shinki, which had released two seminal albums for Atlantic Records Japan. Rock music historian Julian Cope narrates in his book, Japrocksampler (Bloomsbury, 2007), that Shinki Chen had recruited Joey “Pepe” Smith on drums / lead vocal (and Masayoshi Kabe on bass guitar and later Kabe’s replacement, Mike Hanopol on bass guitar) from a Filipino rock group called Zero History, which he found performing at Astro shopping mall in Yokohama, Japan. (Zero History additional members included Mike Hanopol on bass guitar & Wally Gonzalez on lead guitar.) And thus the vibe of Speed, Glue & Shinki is noteworthy in the earliest contributions of Smith and Hanopol for the Juan de la Cruz collaboration, especially in the stop-start heaviness of "Take You Home" (a song by the American heavy psych group Fields, originally released in 1969, revived from the eponymous second album of S,G&S), and the talking blues of "Blues Train".

The ensuing album by the iconic trio of Gonzalez, Smith & Hanopol, unfurling its masterly title track, "Himig Natin" (English translation: "Our Hymn"), went on to become the anthem of Manila's post-hippie culture and underground radio network, particularly the DZRJ-AM radio show, Pinoy Rock 'n' Rhythm—later on shortened to "Pinoy rock". The song is widely known as the first example of Pinoy rock. Himig Natin rallied Pinoy rock, which swelled into a movement and provided indicators of its yet-unrealized commercial fuel. The social impact and innovations of the Juan de la Cruz Band inadvertently became the catalyst for the inception of Original Pilipino Music (OPM) and the viability for diverse, originally-authored musical genres to emerge and thrive in the Philippines.

Recent
They were awarded the ASAP Pinoy Band's Special Lifetime Achievement Award on ASAP Natin 'To (formerly ASAP) in 2017, for their contributions to Filipino music as one of the greatest Pinoy rock bands in OPM rock history.

Longtime band drummer / guitarist / lead vocalist Joey "Pepe" Smith died on January 28, 2019, at the age of 71. Founding lead guitarist Wally Gonzales died on July 23, 2021, also aged 71.

Discography

Studio albums
1971: Up in Arms (Philippines LP - Vicor/Sunshine Records / German CD - Normal Records/Shadoks Music, 2001)
Note: The Juan Dela Cruz management had issued a statement that the German CD reissue is unauthorized. The CD also contains six unverified "live" bonus tracks, which may have been lifted from The Super Hits of the Juan Dela Cruz Band / Live and In Concert album, which is also tagged as being unauthorized and spurious.
1973: Himig Natin (LP, Vicor/Sunshine Records / CD, Vicor/Sunshine, released 2004 - officially reissued on LP by Vicor 2021)
1974: Maskara (LP, Vicor/Sunshine Records / CD, Vicor/Sunshine, released 2004)
1981: Kahit Anong Mangyari (LP, Blackgold Records)

Live and other albums
1975: Super Session (LP, Vicor/Sunshine Records)
1977: The Super Hits of The Juan Dela Cruz Band / Live and In Concert (LP, Vicor/Sunshine Records)
Note: The Juan Dela Cruz management had issued statements that this release was spurious. Tracks were implied to be original studio tracks with applause merely added artificially.

Compilations
1980: The Best Of Juan Dela Cruz Band (LP, Vicor/Sunshine Records)
1983: The Best Of Pinoy Rock (LP, Blackgold Records)
1985: The Best Of Pinoy Rock Vol. 1 & 2  (Collectors' Edition LP, Blackgold Records)
1994: Himig Natin (Special Collector's Edition) (Vicor Music Corporation / Blackgold Records
Note: This compilation is actually a 15-track hodge-podge of selections from Himig Natin, Maskara, Super Session and Kahit Anong Mangyari.
Pinoy Rock (undated, circa 2008) (Vicor)
2014: Tatak: Greatest Hits (Poly East Records)

Band members

Former
Sandy Tagarro 
Edmund Fortuno+
Bing Labrador 
Alex Cruz 
Clifford Ho
Bobot Guerrero 
Larry Martinez 
Tony Rodriguez
Pepe Smith (vocalist, drummer) (1947-2019; his death)
Wally Gonzalez (1949-2021; his death)
Mike Hanopol

Other members (unrecorded)

Pre-millennium (1970s and 1980s)
Nides Aranzamendez (session drummer)
Tony Rodriguez (bass guitar)
Larry Martinez (keyboards)
Lito Guanco (keyboards)

Millennium era (reunions)
Dondi Ledesma (bass guitar)
Wowee Posadas (keyboards)
Wendell Garcia (drums)
Gilbert Nogales (drums)

Additional historical information
A partial reunion of the original lineup of the Juan de la Cruz Band occurred in the summer of 1974, under the name Cara Y Cruz, which formed to participate in the 'National Battle of the Bands' event (sponsored by RC Cola). The nom de guerre was perhaps utilized to circumvent a technicality that only unsigned bands were eligible to participate in the competition. They made two performances: at the Araneta Center (on an improvised stage behind the Smart Araneta Coliseum); and at 'Jam Park', a vacant lot leased for the multi-part event in the Makati area, situated alongside the South Luzon Expressway (SLEX). The nearly-reconstituted band consisted of Wally Gonzalez (guitar), Sonny Tolentino (bass guitar), Edmund Fortuno (drums), Bing Labrador (organ), Alex Cruz (saxophones & flute), with Jacqui Magno (vocals). Ironically, the group progressed only up until the semi-finals phase of the Battle of the Bands, after which they again disbanded.

Awards
Special Lifetime Achievement Award, ASAP Pinoy 2017, ASAP Show, ABS-CBN 2

See also
Asin
Freddie Aguilar
Mike Hanopol
Pinoy rock
Sampaguita

References

External links
pinoyclassicrock.com
 
 
Wally Gonzalez' Juan dela Cruz Band Page

Filipino rock music groups
Musical groups from Metro Manila
1968 establishments in the Philippines
1981 disestablishments in the Philippines
1998 establishments in the Philippines
2019 disestablishments in the Philippines
Musical groups established in 1968
Musical groups disestablished in 1981
Musical groups reestablished in 1998
Musical groups disestablished in 2019